Strangford College, also known as Strangford Integrated College, is a school in Carrowdore, Newtownards, County Down, Northern Ireland. It is an integrated co-educational secondary school with a grammar stream for 800 pupils. Clare Foster is the school's current principal.

Context
Integrated Education is a Northern Ireland phenomenon, where traditionally schools were sectarian, either Catholic or Protestant. On parental request, a school could apply to 'transition' to become grant-maintained and offer 30% of the school places to students from the minority community. Lagan College was the first integrated school to open in 1981. , pupils at Strangford College are approximately 45% from a Protestant background, approximately 25% from a Catholic background and approximately 30% from "other" backgrounds.

History
Strangford College opened 1 September 1997, with 64 students and 7 staff. It was awarded grant-maintained status in September 1999.

A new build was approved by the Department of Education in April 2016 and a contractor appointed in 2021.

In 2021, the college applied to raise its official enrolment number from 670 to 760; the minister at first refused the request, but on appeal, reversed his decision. This allows the college to accept 130 year 8 students a year.

The college applied unsuccessfully in 2019 to use transfer tests to select the 35% of pupils it admits to the grammar stream in Year 8. It reapplied in January 2022.

See also
 Education in Northern Ireland
 List of integrated schools in Northern Ireland
 List of secondary schools in Northern Ireland

References

External links
Strangford College
Strangford College Prospectus 2020/2021

 

Integrated schools in County Down
Secondary schools in County Down